Big Indian Creek is a stream in the U.S. state of Georgia. It is a tributary to the Ocmulgee River.

Big Indian Creek was so named in honor of Tustinugee, a Creek chieftain, on account of his large stature.

References

Rivers of Georgia (U.S. state)
Rivers of Houston County, Georgia
Rivers of Macon County, Georgia
Rivers of Peach County, Georgia
Rivers of Pulaski County, Georgia